Castelnovo del Friuli is a comune (municipality) in the Province of Pordenone in the Italian region Friuli-Venezia Giulia, located about  northwest of Trieste and about  northeast of Pordenone.

Castelnovo del Friuli borders the following municipalities: Clauzetto, Pinzano al Tagliamento, Tramonti di Sotto, Travesio, Vito d'Asio.

References

Cities and towns in Friuli-Venezia Giulia